Frederick Robert Harold John (born 6 September 1991) is a Welsh former first-class cricketer.

John was born at Newport in September 1991. He was educated at Clifton College, before going up to Oxford Brookes University. While studying at Oxford Brookes, John made two appearances in first-class cricket for Oxford MCCU against Glamorgan and Worcestershire in 2012. Playing as a wicket-keeper, he scored 55 runs at an average of 27.50 and with a high score of 27.

Notes and references

External links

1991 births
Living people
Sportspeople from Newport, Wales
People educated at Clifton College
Alumni of Oxford Brookes University
Welsh cricketers
Oxford MCCU cricketers